Coombe Hill may refer to:

Places
 Coombe Hill, Buckinghamshire, England
 Coombe Hill, a different hill on the flank of Haddington Hill in Buckinghamshire, England
 Coombe Hill (Cotswolds), near Wotton-under-Edge, Gloucestershire, England
 Coombe Hill, Tewkesbury, a hamlet between Gloucester and Tewkesbury, Gloucestershire, England
Coombe Hill, Kingston upon Thames, London, England
Coombe Hill Assistants' Tournament, a golf tournament
Coombe Hill Wood

Other uses
Coombe Hill, a cargo ship built in 1942 for Putney Hill Steamships

See also 
Combe Hill (disambiguation)
Coombe (disambiguation)